Ahmed Abdullah Saad Al-Yaari (born 16 January 2000) is a Yemeni sprinter specialising in the 400 metres. He represented Yemen at the 2020 Summer Olympics. He is the Yemeni record holder in the 200 and 400 metres dash.

Career
Al-Yaari began his international career for Yemen at the 2017 Asian Youth Athletics Championships. He then competed at the Asian Athletics Championships where he finished in 24th place. He was scheduled to represent Yemen at the 2018 IAAF World U20 Championships in the 400 metres, however, he did not did not start. 

In April 2019 at the Asian Athletics Championships, Al-Yaari set the Yemeni national record in the 400 metres with a time of 48.27. In September 2019 at the World Athletics Championships, Al-Yaari set the Yemeni national record in the 200 metres with a time of 22.37.

Al-Yaari represented Yemen at the 2020 Summer Olympics in the 400 metres.

International competitions

References

External links
 

2000 births
Living people
Yemeni male sprinters
Athletes (track and field) at the 2020 Summer Olympics
Olympic athletes of Yemen
21st-century Yemeni people